Animal movement may refer to:
Animal locomotion
Animal migration
Transportation of animals